Revaluate is artificial intelligence for the real estate and mortgage industry. Revaluate segments lists and databases for marketers by propensity to move.  The award winning third party validated accuracy is the best in the industry at identifying people who are likely to move in the next six months.  Marketers use this refined and targeted data to greatly increase the efficiency of their campaigns. On Dec. 1, 2020, Revaluate announced the launch of Reside, a growth engine to bring new business; stepping beyond the limitations of their current database, Reside allows marketers to choose new geographic areas for customer growth, blending new customer lists into existing sales processes. This newly segmented database will introduce them to market segments, people, and business opportunities that they may never have connected with otherwise.

History
Revaluate began in 2014 as a startup website that mined data from a wide range of public and private sources and used the information to produce home history reports, each covering a specific residential address. These reports were intended to help consumers make better-informed housing decisions, analogous to the need that online reviews serve for other products and services.  In the same month, it closed a convertible debt financing round for an undisclosed amount.  In its first two months of operation it averaged a week-over-week growth rate of 20%. In 2016 they transitioned into the Revaluate you know today.

References

External links
 Official Website

Real estate companies established in 2014
American real estate websites
Online real estate databases
2014 establishments in New York City
Companies based in New York (state)